Roberto Andrés González Beltrán (born 19 May 1976) is a Chilean former footballer who played as a goalkeeper.

Career

Youth career

González started his career at Primera División de Chile club O'Higgins. He progressed from the under categories club all the way to the senior team.

O'Higgins

In 2012, González was runner-up with O'Higgins, after lose the final against Universidad de Chile in the penalty shoot-out.

González won the Apertura 2013-14 with O'Higgins. In the tournament, he played in 2 of 18 matches.

In 2014, he won the Supercopa de Chile against Deportes Iquique, being the goalkeeper of this match, and saving two penalty shoots at the shoot-out that won O'Higgins.

He participated with the club in the 2014 Copa Libertadores where they faced Deportivo Cali, Cerro Porteño and Lanús, being third and being eliminated in the group stage.

Career statistics

Club

Honours

Club

O'Higgins
Primera División: Apertura 2013-14
Supercopa de Chile: 2014

Individual

O'Higgins
Medalla Santa Cruz de Triana: 2014

References

External links

1976 births
Living people
People from Cachapoal Province
Chilean footballers
Association football goalkeepers
O'Higgins F.C. footballers
Everton de Viña del Mar footballers
Cobresal footballers
Primera B de Chile players
Chilean Primera División players